Verkhniye Karyavdy (Ürge Qaryawźı) is a rural locality (a selo) in Chekmagushevsky District, Bashkortostan, Russia. The population was 34 as of 2010. There is 1 street.

Geography 
Verkhniye Karyavdy is located 23 km southwest of Chekmagush (the district's administrative centre) by road. Nizhniye Karyavdy is the nearest rural locality.

References 

Rural localities in Chekmagushevsky District